The McGraw Ranch, also known as the Indian Head Ranch, the =Y Ranch (Double Bar-Y) and the =X Ranch (Double Bar-X), was established in the Cow Creek valley near Estes Park, Colorado by Peter J. Pauley, Jr., who built a barn at his  =Y Ranch in 1884, running 2500 head of cattle on the land. The land was sold in 1897 to Hugo S. Miller, who worked with Henry C. Rouse to expand the property to a thousand acres (4 km²). In 1907 Miller and his wife inherited the lands from Rouse and were visited by Joh J. and Irene McGraw, who leased the property the next summer and purchased it in 1909, changing the brand to =X.

The McGraws ranched the land unprofitably until John died in 1917. Irene continued ranching, but in 1935-36 converted to guest ranching. The McGraw family built several cabins, and under the motto "Ranching with Ease" the family operated the guest ranch until 1973. From 1973 to 1988 the property changed hands several times, until the National Park Service bought it with the intention to restore the landscape to its natural state as part of Rocky Mountain National Park. Opposition from local communities convinced the Park Service to convert the ranch to a research facility. It is the only intact dude ranch in Rocky Mountain National Park.

The ranch was used in 1936 by U.S. presidential candidate Alf Landon as a campaign headquarters, giving the ranch valuable publicity as it was being converted to a dude ranch.

See also
National Register of Historic Places listings in Larimer County, Colorado

References

External links

McGraw Ranch at Coloradohistory.org

Buildings and structures in Larimer County, Colorado
National Register of Historic Places in Rocky Mountain National Park
Historic districts on the National Register of Historic Places in Colorado
Historic American Buildings Survey in Colorado
Ranches on the National Register of Historic Places in Colorado
National Register of Historic Places in Larimer County, Colorado
1884 establishments in Colorado